Karimpany is a village in Akalakkunnam Grama panchayat  Kottayam District, Kerala, India.

Economy
Most of the villagers are farmers, but 80% of the new generation move out of the village to live abroad. Karimpanians are well educated and computer literacy is at a high level when compared to any other village in India. At least 75% of families in Karimpany, have at least one member out for work. Karimpanians have access to almost all kinds of high level education even though they are away from city area. The nearest city is Palai, which is about 18 kilometers away. Even though the transportation facilities are minimal, nothing would stop Karimpanians from having higher education.

Almost all of the educated new generation is out of Karimpany looking for a prosperous career and future. You can find young Karimpanians in Europe, America, Canada, in almost all Southeast Asia such as Singapore, Malaysia and Indonesia. Those who are abroad range from laborers to professionals. For Karimpanian farmers, rubber production is the main income. For those who are unable to further their education, rubber tapping is the main source of income. Though other agricultural business such as black pepper, ginger, turmeric, vegetables and tapioca are present, farmers are losing interest in growing those because of low yields and profit.

Toddy shops
Karimpani is said to be an interesting place to have drinks. You can enter Karimpani through a toddy (a local liquor made from coconut/palm trees) shop and leave Karimpany through another toddy shop.

Churches
Karimpani is also famous for the Blessed Sacrament Church and people believe that the blessings from the church brings prosperity to the village

References

Villages in Kottayam district